Laura Omloop (born 18 May 1999) is a Belgian pop singer who represented her country in the Junior Eurovision Song Contest 2009 in Kyiv, Ukraine, finishing in fourth place. Omloop sang the song "Zo verliefd", which contains yodeling. This was Belgium's best result in the Junior Eurovision Song Contest.

In June 2010, Omloop released the single, "Stapelgek op jou", along with an album titled Verliefd.

Discography

Singles
"Zo Verliefd" (2009)
"Stapelgek Op Jou" (2010)

Albums
Verliefd (2010)
Wereld vol Kleuren (2011)
Klaar Voor! (2012)
Meer (2014)
Zo zonder jou (2015)

References

External links

 

1999 births
Living people
Belgian child singers
Junior Eurovision Song Contest entrants for Belgium
People from Berlaar
Yodelers
21st-century Belgian women singers
21st-century Belgian singers